Raymond Triboulet (3 October 1906 – 26 May 2006) was a French politician. He was a leading World War II resistance fighter who helped U.S., Canadian, and British troops invade France, which was then occupied by Nazi Germany.

Biography

Born in Paris, Raymond Triboulet was a farmer and also had a law degree. At the start of World War II he enlisted in the French Army and was taken prisoner, but was later freed and returned home under the German occupation in 1941. He then joined the Calvados section of the group "Ceux de la Résistance", or Those of the Resistance.

By informing Allied forces of German movements between the towns of Caen and Bayeux, he contributed to the success of the D-Day landings of 6 June 1944. Following the reinstatement of a legitimate French government, Charles de Gaulle appointed him the first local governor of liberated France, in the Normandy town of Bayeux.

He was elected to Parliament in 1946 and served until 1973. He served as a minister in the governments of Michel Debré and Georges Pompidou from 1959 to 1966 and then became a member of the Council of Europe and the European Parliament.

He was elected to the Académie des sciences morales et politiques in 1979, serving as its president in 1991.

Publications
Un gaulliste de la IVe, Plon, 1985 (A Gaullist from the IVth Republic)
Un ministre du Général, Plon, 1985 (Minister to the General)

External links
Obituary, The Guardian, 16 June 2006 accessed at  19 July 2006
 Raymond Triboulet accessed at :fr:Raymond Triboulet 21:02, 21 October 2006 (UTC)

1906 births
2006 deaths
Politicians from Paris
Rally of the French People politicians
Union for the New Republic politicians
Union of Democrats for the Republic politicians
French Ministers of Veterans Affairs
Deputies of the 1st National Assembly of the French Fourth Republic
Deputies of the 2nd National Assembly of the French Fourth Republic
Deputies of the 3rd National Assembly of the French Fourth Republic
Deputies of the 1st National Assembly of the French Fifth Republic
Deputies of the 2nd National Assembly of the French Fifth Republic
Deputies of the 3rd National Assembly of the French Fifth Republic
Deputies of the 4th National Assembly of the French Fifth Republic
French Resistance members
French people of the Algerian War
Members of the Académie des sciences morales et politiques
Knights Commander of the Order of Merit of the Federal Republic of Germany